Asveja Regional Park, established in 1992, covers 11,589 hectares in east-central Lithuania near the town of Dubingiai. It protects a glacial landscape that includes 30 lakes. Wetlands comprise about 8% of its territory.

The park also contains the Dubingiai Mound and castle site, burial grounds, several villages, and a historic schoolhouse.

References

 . Association of Lithuanian Regional Parks.
  . Official website.

Regional parks of Lithuania
Tourist attractions in Utena County